Peter Fishbach (born August 29, 1947) is an American former professional tennis player.

Biography
Fishbach was born and raised in New York City. He attended Great Neck North High School. In 1963, 1964, and 1965 he was the New York State Public Schools Athletic Association tennis singles champion. He is the son of Joe Fishbach, who is considered a pioneer of indoor tennis courts, opening the country's first in 1958. His younger brother Mike Fishbach was a professional player, most famous for his controversial use of the "spaghetti racquet".

A right-handed player, Fishbach played collegiate tennis for the University of Michigan. He also competed on tour, twice getting through to the second round of the US Open, in 1967 and 1968. His win in the former, against John Sharpe, went to 16–14 in the fifth set. 

At the 1969 Maccabiah Games in Israel, he and partner Tom Karp were defeated by American Davis Cup player Allen Fox and Ronald Goldman in the semifinals. 

He is a former coach of South African player Christo van Rensburg.

References

External links
 
 

1947 births
Living people
American male tennis players
Jewish American sportspeople
Jewish tennis players
Maccabiah Games competitors for the United States
Competitors at the 1969 Maccabiah Games
Maccabiah Games tennis players
Tennis people from New York (state)
Michigan Wolverines men's tennis players